WKDM (1380 AM) is a commercial radio station licensed to New York, New York. The station is owned by Multicultural Broadcasting and broadcasts on weekdays in Mandarin Chinese. Most shows are brokered programming, where the host pays for the time and may sell commercials to support the broadcasts. On weekends, programming switches to Spanish language Christian radio.

WKDM operates at 5,000 watts by day, using a directional antenna to protect other stations on 1380 AM.  After being granted a Federal Communications Commission (FCC) construction permit to increase night power, it operates at 13,000 watts after sunset, using a different directional pattern. The station's transmitter is located in Carlstadt, New Jersey.

History
The station began operation in 1926 as WBNX, the call letters reflecting the station's location in the borough of The Bronx. One of the station's first permanent homes was inside Starlight Park, an amusement park located on the east bank of the Bronx River just south of East 177th Street.  This tenancy lasted until 1932, when the Great Depression forced the park's closure, which then led to the station's eviction from its studios.

WBNX changed frequencies several times during its early years, eventually finding a permanent home on 1380 kHz, sharing time on the frequency with religious broadcaster WAWZ in central New Jersey. It operated 18 hours a day with general entertainment and brokered programming.

In 1960 WBNX was sold to United Broadcasting. By the mid-1960s, WBNX was airing a Spanish contemporary music format during most of its hours, with some Jewish-oriented and Italian-language programming on weekends.

In 1984 the station changed the call letters to WKDM and became a full-time operation as United paid WAWZ owner Pillar of Fire to give up its portion of the time-share (WAWZ continued to operate on FM). It remained successful until the advent of a full-time Spanish language format on WSKQ-FM in 1989, which pulled away listeners. As a result, in the early 1990s the station began to carry more leased-access/brokered shows. In 1992 it went completely brokered, and was sold to Multicultural in 1994.

In 1999 Multicultural transferred WKDM to Mega Communications in exchange for cash and various Washington D.C. area stations.  Mega changed the call letters to WNNY and instituted an all news Spanish format (Noticas 1380). Eventually, the all-news evolved into a news/talk format.  This format was not successful, and by 2002 Mega had changed the call letters to WLXE and the format to Mexican pop music as "X-1380".  A few months later, Multicultural bought the station back and reinstated the WKDM call sign and the brokered programming policy.

Since 2007, WKDM has broadcast in Mandarin Chinese 24 hours a day Monday through Friday, featuring drama, popular music, talk shows, news program, children’s programs and sports, as well as programs from China and Taiwan.

References

External links
FCC History Cards for WKDM
WKDM AM1380 Mandarin Chinese website
Spanish website

KDM
Radio stations established in 1926
Multicultural Broadcasting stations